A first-person narrative is a mode of storytelling in which a storyteller recounts events from their own point of view using the first person  It may be narrated by a first-person protagonist (or other focal character), first-person re-teller, first-person witness, or first-person peripheral. A classic example of a first-person protagonist narrator is Charlotte Brontë's Jane Eyre (1847), in which the title character is also the narrator telling her own story, "I could not unlove him now, merely because I found that he had ceased to notice me".

This device allows the audience to see the narrator's mind's eye view of the fictional universe, but it is limited to the narrator's experiences and awareness of the true state of affairs. In some stories, first-person narrators may relay dialogue with other characters or refer to information they heard from the other characters, in order to try to deliver a larger point of view. Other stories may switch the narrator to different characters in order to introduce a broader perspective. An unreliable narrator is one that has completely lost credibility due to ignorance, poor insight, personal biases, mistakes, dishonesty, etc., which challenges the reader's initial assumptions.

Point of view device

Identity

Reliability

In the first-person-plural point of view, narrators tell the story using "we". That is, no individual speaker is identified; the narrator is a member of a group that acts as a unit. The first-person-plural point of view occurs rarely but can be used effectively, sometimes as a means to increase the concentration on the character or characters the story is about. Examples include:
 William Faulkner's short story "A Rose for Emily" (Faulkner was an avid experimenter in using unusual points of view; see also his Spotted Horses, told in third-person plural).
 Frank B. Gilbreth and Ernestine Gilbreth Carey's memoir Cheaper by the Dozen.
 Theodore Sturgeon's short story "Crate".
 Frederik Pohl's Man Plus.
 Jeffrey Eugenides's The Virgin Suicides.
 Karen Joy Fowler's The Jane Austen Book Club.
 Joshua Ferris's Then We Came to the End.
 Heidi Vornbrock Roosa's short story "Our Mother Who Art".

Other examples include Twenty-Six Men and a Girl by Maxim Gorky, The Treatment of Bibi Haldar by Jhumpa Lahiri, During the Reign of the Queen of Persia by Joan Chase, Our Kind by Kate Walbert, I, Robot by Isaac Asimov, and We Didn't by Stuart Dybek.

First-person narrators can also be multiple, as in Ryūnosuke Akutagawa's In a Grove (the source for the movie Rashomon) and Faulkner's novel The Sound and the Fury. Each of these sources provides different accounts of the same event, from the point of view of various first-person narrators.

There can also be multiple co-principal characters as narrator, such as in Robert A. Heinlein's The Number of the Beast. The first chapter introduces four characters, including the initial narrator, who is named at the beginning of the chapter. The narrative continues in subsequent chapters with a different character explicitly identified as the narrator for that chapter. Other characters later introduced in the book also have their "own" chapters where they narrate the story for that chapter. The story proceeds in a linear fashion, and no event occurs more than once, i.e. no two narrators speak "live" about the same event.

These can be distinguished as "first-person major" or "first-person minor" points of view.

Autobiography
Another example is a fictional "Autobiography of James T. Kirk"  which was "Edited" by David A. Goodman who was the actual writer of that book and playing the part of James Kirk (Gene Roddenberry's Star Trek) as he wrote the novel.

Detective fiction
Since the narrator is within the story, he or she may not have knowledge of all the events. For this reason, the first-person narrative is often used for detective fiction, so that the reader and narrator uncover the case together. One traditional approach in this form of fiction is for the main detective principal assistant, the "Watson", to be the narrator: this derives from the character of Dr. Watson in Sir Arthur Conan Doyle's Sherlock Holmes stories.

Forms
First-person narratives can appear in several forms; interior monologue, as in Fyodor Dostoevsky's Notes from Underground; dramatic monologue, also in Albert Camus' The Fall; or explicitly, as Mark Twain's Adventures of Huckleberry Finn.

Styles
First-person narratives can tend towards a stream of consciousness and interior monologue, as in Marcel Proust's In Search of Lost Time. The whole of the narrative can itself be presented as a false document, such as a diary, in which the narrator makes explicit reference to the fact that he is writing or telling a story. This is the case in Bram Stoker's Dracula. As a story unfolds, narrators may be aware that they are telling a story and of their reasons for telling it. The audience that they believe they are addressing can vary. In some cases, a frame story presents the narrator as a character in an outside story who begins to tell their own story, as in Mary Shelley's Frankenstein.

First-person narrators are often unreliable narrators since a narrator might be impaired (such as both Quentin and Benjy in Faulkner's The Sound and the Fury), lie (as in The Quiet American by Graham Greene, or The Book of the New Sun series by Gene Wolfe), or manipulate their own memories intentionally or not (as in The Remains of the Day by Kazuo Ishiguro, or in Ken Kesey's One Flew Over the Cuckoo's Nest). Henry James discusses his concerns about "the romantic privilege of the 'first person'" in his preface to The Ambassadors, calling it "the darkest abyss of romance."

One example of a multi-level narrative structure is Joseph Conrad's novella Heart of Darkness, which has a double framework: an unidentified "I" (first person singular) narrator relates a boating trip during which another character, Marlow, uses the first person to tell a story that comprises the majority of the work. Within this nested story, it is mentioned that another character, Kurtz, told Marlow a lengthy story; however, its content is not revealed to readers. Thus, there is an "I" narrator introducing a storyteller as "he" (Marlow), who talks about himself as "I" and introduces another storyteller as "he" (Kurtz), who in turn presumably told his story from the perspective of "I".

Film
An example of first-person narration in a film would be the narration given by the character Greg Heffley in the film adaptation of the popular book series Diary of a Wimpy Kid.

See also
 Narration

References

Narratology
Fiction
Style (fiction)
Point of view